Afterdrop is a continued cooling of a patient's core temperature during the initial stages of rewarming from hypothermia.

Afterdrop is attributed to the return of cold blood to extremities from the core due to peripheral vasodilatation, thus causing a further decrease of deep body temperature. However a second theory explains afterdrop as a side effect of conductive heat transfer. "The hypothermic patient cools from the outside in. Consequently, a heat gradient is established from the relatively warm core to the cool periphery. This heat gradient does not reverse immediately upon initiation of rewarming. Until the gradient is reversed, further heat transfer occurs from the warmer core to cooler peripheral tissues."

In severe cases, afterdrop can lead to post-rescue collapse, but has not been shown to be of any clinical importance in rewarming the hypothermic patient. Afterdrop is not observed in the rewarming of all hypothermic patients. It is more common in patients who were rapidly cooled or rewarmed. Afterdrop was less common in patients for whom rewarming was delayed, or when cooling was slow and prolonged.

References

Medical emergencies